Curious George Takes a Job is a children's book written and illustrated by Margaret Rey and H. A. Rey and published by Houghton Mifflin in 1947. It is the second of the Curious George books and tells the story of George taking a job as a window washer.

Plot
The book picks up where the first book ends. George is living in the zoo, until he gets a key from a zookeeper and escapes his cage. In the city, George sneaks into a restaurant where he is caught in the kitchen eating a pot of spaghetti and forced by the cook to wash the dishes, but he does a splendid job. As a reward, the cook takes him to meet an elevator man, who gives him a job as a window washer for a tall apartment building. As George works, he observes many people in the different windows, such as a child refusing to eat spinach and a man sleeping. Once he reaches the final window, he notices a room behind the window being painted. George lets curiosity get to him again, he enters the apartment just as the painters leave for lunch and decides to paint it for them.

An hour later, the painters return and see that George has given the room a jungle theme, including painting the furniture coverings as animals. Furious, the painters, the elevator man, and the lady owning the apartment chase him out of the room and down a fire escape, followed by the other tenants. George then jumps from the end of the stairway, thinking he will be home free but forgetting how hard the pavement is. The jump causes him to break his leg and an ambulance soon arrives to take George to the hospital. As the others look on, the lady of the apartment remarks that the injury serves him right for ruining her room and the elevator man adds he knew that George would get into trouble because he was too curious.

In the hospital, he unhappily lies in bed with his leg in a cast hanging above him. George's incident makes the front page of a local newspaper, which the Man with the Yellow Hat sees, so he contacts the hospital to claim him.

Once George's leg has healed, he climbs out of bed and winds up tampering with a bottle of ether and passes out. The Man with the Yellow Hat, the doctor, and the nurse find him and manage to bring him around after putting him under a cold shower. Afterwards, George is taken to a movie studio to film a movie about his life, which he and all of the townsfolk he met later come to watch in the theater.

Reception 
The book has received reviews from publications including School Library Journal, Kirkus Reviews, The New Yorker, and New York Herald Tribune.

References 

1947 children's books
American picture books
Curious George
Houghton Mifflin books